Dante Rafael López Fariña (born 16 August 1983 in Asunción) is a retired Paraguayan professional footballer.

López's good form with lowly club Crotone earned him a call up for Paraguay at the 2007 Copa America. His form attracted some interest of a few larger Italian clubs, including Napoli. However, López moved back to Paraguay to play for Libertad, after the relegation of Crotone from Serie B.

Zacatepec

On 9 June 2016, it was announced that Lopez along with Pumas teammate Ludueña would join Zacatepec in the Ascenso MX.

Honours

Club titles

Individual awards
 Paraguayan 1st Division topscorer in 2005.
 Participation in the 2006 FIFA World Cup with Paraguay.

References

External links
 
 
 
 
 Dante López at Footballdatabase

1983 births
Living people
Paraguayan footballers
Club Sol de América footballers
Cerro Porteño players
Maccabi Haifa F.C. players
Córdoba CF players
Club Nacional footballers
Club Olimpia footballers
Genoa C.F.C. players
F.C. Crotone players
Club Libertad footballers
Club Universidad Nacional footballers
Club Guaraní players
Atlético Zacatepec footballers
Deportivo Capiatá players
Paraguayan Primera División players
Israeli Premier League players
Segunda División players
Serie B players
Liga MX players
Paraguay under-20 international footballers
Paraguay international footballers
2004 Copa América players
2006 FIFA World Cup players
2007 Copa América players
Paraguayan expatriate footballers
Expatriate footballers in Israel
Expatriate footballers in Spain
Expatriate footballers in Italy
Expatriate footballers in Mexico
Paraguayan expatriate sportspeople in Israel
Paraguayan expatriate sportspeople in Spain
Paraguayan expatriate sportspeople in Italy
Paraguayan expatriate sportspeople in Mexico
Association football forwards